Asturias, an autonomous community in Spain, is divided into eight comarcas. These comarcas are not an administrative division of the autonomous community, and are only used as a system to homogenize the statistical data made by the Principality of Asturias.

The comarcas in Spain are a grouping of municipalities that are encouraged (but not required) to work together to achieve objectives. Comarca is a Spanish word roughly equivalent to the English word county.

List of comarcas of Asturias
The comarcas of Asturias are listed here, each with its Spanish-language name first, followed by its Asturian-language name if that differs:

Avilés 
Caudal 
Eo-Navia 
Gijón / Xixón
Nalón 
Narcea
Oriente
Oviedo / Uviéu

See also
 Comarcas of Spain

 

es:Comarcas de Asturias